The 2010–11 Big East Conference men's basketball season was the 32nd season of competitive basketball played by the Big East Conference, since its inception in 1979, and involved its 16 full-time member schools. The season officially opened on December 27, 2010, when Pittsburgh defeated Connecticut, 78–63, and ended on March 5, 2011, with a 72–56 victory for St. John's over South Florida.

Pittsburgh captured the regular season title for the fourth time, and third outright, with a conference win–loss record of 15–3. The Panthers also received the no. 1 seed in the Big East tournament, and a bye into the quarterfinals, along with 2nd-seed Notre Dame, 3rd-seed Louisville, and 4th-seed Syracuse. St. John's, West Virginia, Cincinnati, and Georgetown rounded out the top eight, and all received a bye into the tournament's second round. Play began at noon on Tuesday, March 8 in Madison Square Garden, when 9th-seed Connecticut defeated 16th-seed DePaul, 97–71. Play ended on Saturday, March 12, when Connecticut won their fifth game in five days, defeating Louisville, 69–66, for their seventh Big East Championship.

At the finish of the regular season, prior to seeding for the 2011 NCAA Division I men's basketball tournament, it was widely speculated that the Big East would eclipse its NCAA record 8 bids, sending as many as 11 teams to the tournament. The official tournament selection process took place on Sunday, March 13, and the predictions were accurate, as the following 11 Big East teams received bids into the tournament. Connecticut won the national title, its third-ever national championship.

Preseason

Coaching changes

Prior to the start of the 2010–11 season, four Big East programs hired new coaches, following the dismissal or resignation of their former coaches:

DePaul: Jerry Wainwright was fired in the middle of the 2009–10 season, after a 7–8 start, and a 22-game Big East losing streak. Wainwright, who compiled a 59–80 record, and a 20–51 conference record, in five seasons at the school, was replaced on an interim basis by assistant coach Tracy Webster, who remained with the team until a new head coach was hired. On April 6, 2010, Clemson head coach Oliver Purnell was named the 13th head coach of the Blue Demons.
Rutgers: After a lackluster performance by the Scarlet Knights during his four-year tenure, and a postseason incident at a Pittsburgh—Rutgers baseball game, in which he got into a shouting match with several of the Pittsburgh coaches, Fred Hill resigned his position as head coach on April 19, 2010. It was reported that Hill had been asked to return for the 2010–11 season, however the shouting incident prompted Rutgers athletic director Tim Pernetti to ask for Hill's resignation, settling for an $850,000 contract buyout in exchange. On May 6, 2010, Robert Morris head coach Mike Rice Jr. was announced as the 17th head coach of the Scarlet Knights. Rice came to Rutgers after a successful three-year tenure at Robert Morris, achieving a 73–31 (.702) record, a 46–8 (.852) conference record, and two consecutive Northeast Conference tournament championships, leading to automatic bids into both the 2009 and 2010 NCAA Tournaments.
Seton Hall: Bobby Gonzalez was fired on March 17, 2010 after four tumultuous seasons with the Pirates, in which both his on and off court actions were heavily scrutinized. The decision followed Seton Hall's 87–69 loss to Texas Tech in the first round of the 2010 National Invitation Tournament, in which then-sophomore forward Herb Pope was ejected from the game for punching Texas Tech player Darko Cohadarevic in the groin, and Gonzalez himself received his seventh technical foul of the season. In a statement, Seton Hall University president Monsignor Robert Sheeran said he told Gonzalez that he had "lost [his] confidence in [Gonzalez's] ability to coach and lead this program," and had made the decision to fire Gonzalez on his own after consulting members of the campus community. On March 29, 2010, former assistant to Rick Pitino at Louisville and Iona head coach Kevin Willard was named the 19th head coach of the Pirates.
St. John's: Norm Roberts was fired as head coach on March 19, 2010, after losing its first round NIT game against Memphis, 73–71. Roberts left the team after six seasons, compiling an 81–101 (.445) record, a 32–70 (.314) conference record, and only one winning season. He was replaced on March 31, 2010 by former UCLA head coach (1996–2003) and then-ESPN analyst Steve Lavin.

Conference predictions

At Big East media day in October, the conference released their predictions for standings and All-Big East teams.

Predicted Big East results

Preseason All-Big East teams

Big East Preseason Player of the Year: Austin Freeman, G., Georgetown 
Big East Preseason Rookie of the Year: Fab Melo, C., Syracuse

Preseason national polls

Watchlists
On October 4, the Wooden Award preseason watch list included seven Big East players. The watchlist was composed of 50 players who were not transfers, freshmen or medical redshirts. On October 29, the Naismith College Player of the Year watchlist of 50 players was announced, which included seven Big East names.

Regular season

Season summary & highlights 

 Pittsburgh won the 2K Sports Coaches vs. Cancer Classic, defeating Texas in the finals, 68–66.
 Georgetown won the Charleston Classic, defeating North Carolina State, 82–67.
 Connecticut won the Maui Invitational Tournament, upsetting #2 Michigan State in the semifinals, 70–67, and #8 Kentucky in the finals, 84–67. The wins propelled Connecticut from receiving votes in the AP Poll on November 22 to a #7 ranking on the next poll date, November 29.
 St. John's won the Great Alaska Shootout, defeating Arizona State, 67–58.
 Notre Dame won the Old Spice Classic, defeating Wisconsin, 58–51.
 Syracuse won the Legends Classic, defeating Georgia Tech, 80–76.
 On February 23, Providence's Marshon Brooks scored 52 points in a loss to Notre Dame, breaking the Big East single-game record of 48 points set by Providence's Eric Murdock in 1991.
 In February, following the result of an investigation into recruiting violations, Connecticut coach Jim Calhoun was suspended by the NCAA for three Big East games during the 2011–12 season. The investigation began after a March 2009 Yahoo! Sports report that a former team manager and agent provided former recruit Nate Miles with housing, transportation, meals and representation, that members of Calhoun's staff were aware of this, and that staff members were in violation of NCAA limits on contacting Miles. Dennis Thomas, chairman of the NCAA Committee on Infractions, stated that Calhoun was cited for "not being on top of these issues with the agent, the booster." The team will also be required to forfeit one scholarship, from 13 to 12, and 40 recruiting days, from 130 to 90, for the three upcoming seasons, and will be on probation until February 21, 2014.
 On March 5, Providence's Marshon Brooks scored 28 points in a regular season-ending win over Rutgers, giving him 468 points for the Big East regular season, breaking the previous single-season record of 462 points set in 1994 by Donyell Marshall of Connecticut.
 On the same day, Syracuse beat DePaul by 48 points, 107–59, in the most lopsided victory in the history of Big East conference play. The Orange also had 12 players combine for 71.4 percent field goal shooting, as well as 77.8 percent from 3-point range and 90.9 percent at the foul line.

Midseason watchlists 

On January 6, the Wooden Award midseason watchlist was released, and included five Big East players. The list was composed of 30 players, reduced from the preseason list of 50. Newcomers included senior forward Marshon Brooks of Providence, senior forward Rick Jackson of Syracuse, and senior guard Brad Wanamaker of Pittsburgh. In addition, five Big East players who were on the preseason list did not appear at midseason: Corey Fisher, Ashton Gibbs, Jeremy Hazell, Kris Joseph, and Brandon Triche. On February 11, the Naismith Top 30 was announced, and included newcomers Jackson, Wanamaker, and Notre Dame guard Ben Hansbrough. Meanwhile, Fisher, Gibbs, Hazell, Kevin Jones, and Joseph, who were on the preseason list, did not appear at midseason.

Statistical leaders 

The regular season team, individual, and attendance figures include all conference and non-conference games played from November 8, 2010 through March 5, 2011.

Team

Individual

Attendance

Postseason

Big East tournament

For the third straight year, all 16 teams in the conference participated in the Big East tournament. Under this format, the teams finishing 9 through 16 in the regular season standings played first round games, while teams 5 through 8 received a bye to the second round. The top 4 teams during the regular season received a bye to the quarterfinals. The five-round tournament spanned five consecutive days, from Tuesday, March 8, through Saturday, March 12, at Madison Square Garden in New York City.

Highlights
 Connecticut won their first Big East tournament game in six years, by defeating DePaul, 97–71, in the first round. Their last win came in 2005 against Georgetown, 66–62, in the quarterfinals. In the six intervening losses, the Huskies were beaten three times by Syracuse, including a Big East record six-overtime, 127–117 decision in the 2009 quarterfinals.
In a controversial finish to a second round game, St. John's defeated Rutgers, 65–63, allowing the Red Storm to advance to the quarterfinals for the first time since 2003. The final seconds of the game were heavily criticized by analysts, including the live ESPN crew, for a lack of officiating that appeared to hinder the Scarlet Knights' late rally, including two uncalled personal fouls against Red Storm players, and an incident in which St. John's forward Justin Brownlee appeared to prematurely celebrate by traveling, stepping out of bounds, and throwing the ball into the stands with more than a second remaining in the game. Rutgers' head coach Mike Rice Jr. could be seen screaming frantically for an explanation for the missed calls, while officials Jim Burr, Tim Higgins and Earl Walton had already left the court. At end of the game, ESPN analyst Doris Burke was quoted as saying, "this was the bizarrest ending of a game I've ever seen," and in a later post-game analysis that "the officials won't sleep tonight." Analyst Fran Fraschilla also added that the officiating "crew lost its composure." Following the game, the head of the NCAA's officiating arm, John Adams, who is in charge of selecting 98 officials for the NCAA tournament, called the lack of officiating "unacceptable," but would still consider the overall body of work of each official throughout the season to determine whether or not they would be invited to the tournament. Big East commissioner John Marinatto released a statement acknowledging "two separate officiating errors" that occurred at the end of the game, but conceded that "neither error is reviewable or correctable under NCAA playing rules." The following day, the conference announced that all three officials had voluntarily withdrawn themselves from the remainder of the tournament, which was, according to Marinatto, "in the best interests of everyone involved — including coaches, student-athletes, game officials and Big East member institutions."

NCAA tournament 

At the finish of the regular season, prior to seeding for the 2011 NCAA Division I men's basketball tournament, it was widely speculated that the Big East would eclipse its NCAA record 8 bids, sending as many as 11 teams to the tournament. The official tournament selection process took place on Sunday, March 13, and the predictions were accurate, as the following 11 Big East teams received bids into the tournament:

After winning the 2011 Big East men's basketball tournament, Connecticut continued its winning streak all the way to the Final Four in Houston, Texas, defeating Butler in the national championship game for their third national title in school history. Connecticut guard Kemba Walker was named the tournament Most Outstanding Player. Fellow Connecticut guard Jeremy Lamb was also named to the Final Four All-Tournament team. In addition, Walker and Lamb were named to the West All-Regional team, the only Big East players to be named to an All-Region team in the tournament.

National Invitation tournament 

No Big East teams were selected to play in the 2011 National Invitation Tournament.

Rankings

Awards and honors

Conference awards and teams 

The following individuals received postseason honors after having been chosen by the Big East Conference coaches.

The Player of the Year, Coach of the Year, Rookie of the Year, and Scholar Athlete of the Year awards were announced on Tuesday, March 8, after the post-game interviews of the first session of the first round of the Big East tournament. The remainder of the individual awards were announced on Monday, March 7, while the All-Big East Men's Basketball Teams were announced on Sunday, March 6. Awardees are chosen by a simple ballot, in which coaches are not allowed to vote for their players or themselves (in the case of the Big East Coach of the Year). Coaches voted for Big East Player of the Year and Rookie of the Year from the first team and all-rookie lists, respectively.

Notre Dame senior guard Ben Hansbrough was named Player of the Year, and head coach Mike Brey was named Coach of the Year, after both leading the Fighting Irish to a surprising second-place finish in the conference regular season, with a record of 14–4. Hansbrough finished the regular season with a team-high 18.5 points per game, and was noted for his all-around quality of play, team leadership, and high efficiency shooting, including .492 field goal shooting, .451 from 3 point range, and .818 at the foul line. Fellow teammate Tim Abromaitis, a senior forward, received the Scholar Athlete of the Year award for the second year in a row, and was only the third player to receive the award in consecutive years.

Defensive Player of the Year Rick Jackson, a senior guard from Syracuse, was chosen for his shot-blocking and rebounding dominance, having led the Big East in both of these statistics during both the conference and non-conference season. This included a leading average of 10.7 rebounds per game, 7.2 defensive rebounds per game, and 2.5 blocks per game.

DePaul freshman forward Cleveland Melvin was named Rookie of the Year, after leading the Blue Demons in scoring, at 14.3 points per game, the highest average for a freshman in the league.

Other awardees included most improved player Dwight Hardy, who was credited with helping lead St. John's to a surprising resurgence in the conference, to a tie for third-place finish, with a conference fourth-best 17.9 points per game. Hardy's teammate Justin Burrell was also honored with the Sixth Man Award, for being key to the Red Storm's success, averaging 6.6 points on 51.1 percent shooting, 5.0 rebounds and 21.1 minutes off the bench. Finally, Pittsburgh senior guard Brad Wanamaker received the Sportsmanship Award for his all-around contribution to the team, as its captain, its leader in rebounds, assists, and steals (at 5.3, 5.2, and 1.5 per game, respectively), and its second-highest scorer (at 11.9 per game).

On the All-Big East Men's Basketball Teams, notable members of the first team included Hansbrough, Hardy, and Providence senior guard/forward Marshon Brooks, who were all given no all-conference consideration prior to the start of the season. Brooks led the conference in scoring, averaging 24.8 points per game, including a Big East single-game record 52 points in a loss to Notre Dame on February 23, 2010. On the All-Rookie Team, DePaul forward Cleveland Melvin was the only player to receive a unanimous selection. Notably absent from the list was Preseason Rookie of the Year Fab Melo, a center from Syracuse, who only averaged 9.4 minutes and 2.2 points off the bench.

National awards and teams

Players 

Connecticut guard Kemba Walker was recognized as a consensus First Team All-American after being named to the first team All-American lists by the Associated Press, the USBWA, the NABC, and Sporting News. Notre Dame guard Ben Hansbrough was a consensus Second Team All-American after being named to the Second Team by all four selecting bodies. In addition, Providence forward Marshon Brooks was selected as a Third Team All-American by the Associated Press. Pittsburgh guard Brad Wanamaker, Syracuse forward Rick Jackson, St. John's guard Dwight Hardy, Georgetown guard Austin Freeman, and Pittsburgh guard Ashton Gibbs were all named Honorable Mention All-Americans by the Associated Press.

Walker was also selected as the winner of the Bob Cousy Award for the nation's best point guard, and won the second-ever Lute Olson Award for the most outstanding non-freshman in the nation.

For the second consecutive year, Notre Dame senior forward Tim Abromaitis was named to the men's basketball Academic All-America First Team, by CoSIDA and ESPN The Magazine. A graduate student, Abromaitis was pursuing an MBA, specializing in finance, and achieved a 3.72 GPA during his penultimate season with the Fighting Irish.

Award finalists 
On March 14, the Wooden Award final ballot was released, and included four Big East players. The list was composed of 20 players, reduced from the midseason list of 30. St. John's guard Dwight Hardy and Notre Dame guard Ben Hansbrough were newcomers to the list, while three Big East players who were on the midseason list did not appear on the final ballot: Austin Freeman, Rick Jackson, and Brad Wanamaker. On March 20, Kemba Walker was named one of four finalists for the Naismith Award.

BYU guard Jimmer Fredette was chosen as both the 2011 Wooden Award and 2011 Naismith Award recipient.

Coaches 
Notre Dame head coach Mike Brey was named the Associated Press Coach of the Year, and was selected for the Henry Iba Award by the USBWA.

See also 

 2010–11 NCAA Division I men's basketball season
 2010–11 Cincinnati Bearcats men's basketball team
 2010–11 Connecticut Huskies men's basketball team
 2010–11 Georgetown Hoyas men's basketball team
 2010–11 Louisville Cardinals men's basketball team
 2010–11 Marquette Golden Eagles men's basketball team
 2010–11 Notre Dame Fighting Irish men's basketball team
 2010–11 Pittsburgh Panthers men's basketball team
 2010–11 Providence Friars men's basketball team
 2010–11 St. John's Red Storm men's basketball team
 2010–11 South Florida Bulls men's basketball team
 2010–11 Syracuse Orange men's basketball team
 2010–11 Villanova Wildcats men's basketball team
 2010–11 West Virginia Mountaineers men's basketball team

Notes and references